Fastjet Mozambique, also known and styled as fastjet Mozambique, was a Mozambican low-cost airline based in Maputo that operated on major domestic routes under the fastjet brand in Mozambique.  Fastjet entered the Mozambican market in partnership with Solenta Aviation Mozambique (SAM), which beforehand had specialised in charter flights.

History 
In September 2017 the Government of Mozambique, through the Civil Aviation Institute of Mozambique (Instituto de Aviação Civil de Moçambique), licensed various airlines for the first time to provide domestic air services in Mozambique in addition to those of the state carrier LAM - Mozambique Airlines.  One of the airlines selected was Solenta Airlines Mozambique, which at the time operated charter services to the oil and gas industry within the country.

Fastjet domestic operations in Mozambique commenced on 3 November 2017, initially to four destinations within the country. They were, however, suspended on 26 October 2019 and ceased all operations.

Corporate affairs

Ownership and structure
Fastjet Mozambique services were operated under licence by Solenta Aviation Mozambique SA, the Mozambican subsidiary of a South African company, Solenta Aviation.

Destinations 
Fastjet Mozambique served the following destinations:

Fleet 
The Fastjet Mozambique fleet consisted of the following aircraft as of October 2019:

See also 
 Airlines of Africa
 Transport in Mozambique

References

External links 

Defunct airlines of Mozambique
Airlines established in 2017
Airlines disestablished in 2019
Defunct low-cost airlines
Companies based in Maputo